The helmeted myna (Basilornis galeatus) is a species of starling in the family Sturnidae. It is endemic to Indonesia.

Description 
It is black with white spots on its face with a significant helmet-like crest.

Habitat 
Its natural habitats are subtropical or tropical moist lowland forest, subtropical or tropical moist montane forest, and swamps. It is threatened by habitat loss.

References

External links
Image at ADW

helmeted myna
Endemic birds of Sulawesi
helmeted myna
Taxonomy articles created by Polbot